William Caviness (born June 22, 1982) is a jazz trumpeter born in Memphis, Tennessee who currently resides in Philadelphia, Pennsylvania.

Education 
Caviness received his masters from the New England Conservatory of Music in 2008, moving to New York City thereafter.

Discography 
Caviness gained increased attention after the release of his first album, A Walk, recorded in 2014. A Walk reached the JazzWeek Top 10 for three straight weeks in 2016 and was reviewed in Downbeat Magazine.

Albums 

 A Walk (Cellar Live, 2014)

As sideman 

 Love + Rockets, Vol. 1: The Transformation (Bluroc, 2011)
 Muse (Creative Nation Music, 2009)
 The Old Ceremony (Alyosha Records, 2005)

References

External links
Official website

Berklee College of Music alumni
American jazz trumpeters
American male trumpeters
Living people
1982 births
21st-century trumpeters
21st-century American male musicians
American male jazz musicians